The City We Became is a 2020 urban fantasy novel by N. K. Jemisin. It was developed from her short story "The City Born Great," first published in her collection How Long 'til Black Future Month? It is her first novel since her triple Hugo Award-winning Broken Earth series and the first in her Great Cities series, followed by The World We Make, released in November 2022

Plot 
The City We Became takes place in New York City, in a version of the world in which major cities become sentient through human avatars. After the avatar of New York falls into a supernatural coma and vanishes, a group of five new avatars representing the five boroughs come together to fight their common Enemy.

Characters

The avatars 

 The Primary: the avatar of New York City. A queer Black homeless young man. An artist and hustler.
 Manny: the avatar of Manhattan. A queer Black man in his late 20s. When he becomes Manhattan's avatar, he loses most memory of his former life, representing his role as a new New Yorker. He is a somewhat ruthless strategist. He can allow non-avatar New Yorkers to see the Enemy if he needs to use them.
Brooklyn "MC Free" Thomason: the avatar of Brooklyn. A Black, middle-aged former rapper, lawyer, and current city councilwoman. She has a child and a sick father. Her power is rooted in music.
 Bronca Siwanoy: the avatar of The Bronx. A lesbian Lenape woman in her 60s. She has a PhD, a hot temper, and a son, and works at the Bronx art center. She is the oldest of the six avatars and thus the holder of the city's lexicon of knowledge.
 Padmini Prakash: the avatar of Queens. A 25-year-old Tamil immigrant graduate student living in Queens. Her first name means "she who sits on the lotus". She can use mathematical imagination to change physical reality.
 Aislyn Houlihan: the avatar of Staten Island. A 30-year-old white woman who lives with her parents on Staten Island. Her father is an abusive, racist cop who calls her "Apple", though her name means "dream". She can become invisible.

Other characters 

 São Paulo: the avatar of the city he is named for. He is brown-skinned, lean, and a smoker. His cigarette smoke can combat the Enemy.
 Hong Kong: the avatar of the city he is named for. He has a Chinese-inflected British accent.
 The Enemy: an infectious, otherworldly life form that wants to kill the newly born city of New York. It appears in many forms, including the Woman in White, Dr. White, contagious fungal fronds, and x-shaped spider-like creatures.
 Veneza: a young Black and Portuguese woman who works with Bronca at the Bronx Art Center. She is from Jersey City.

Reception 
The New York Times review stated, "In the face of current events, The City We Became takes a broad-shouldered stand on the side of sanctuary, family and love. It’s a joyful shout, a reclamation and a call to arms." NPR wrote that the novel is "a love letter, a celebration and an expression of hope and belief that a city and its people can and will stand up to darkness, will stand up to fear, and will, when called to, stand up for each other." A review in Slate said, "The city she sings fizzes so joyously through the veins of this novel that anyone mourning the New York before COVID-19 will likely find The City We Became equally sustaining and elegiac, a tribute to a city that may never fully return to us."

Awards and honors

References 

2020 science fiction novels
2020 American novels
2020 fantasy novels
American LGBT novels
Novels by N. K. Jemisin
Science fantasy
American science fiction novels
American fantasy novels
Afrofuturist novels
Novels set in New York City
New York City in fiction
Novels about racism
Feminist literature
Allegory
Personifications
Political literature
Womanist literature
Womanist novels
LGBT speculative fiction novels
2020s LGBT novels
Novels based on works by H. P. Lovecraft
Orbit Books books